The Parish of Bong Bong is a parish of the County of Camden in the Southern Highlands region of New South Wales. Moss Vale is the largest town in the area. The parish includes the small township of Bong Bong, which was the first village established in the Southern Highlands. The Wingecarribee River forms part of the boundary of the parish in the north and north-east. The Hume Highway passes through a small part of the parish in the north-west. Bowral is just beyond the boundary of the parish in the north-east. Berrima is located just to the north-west. The Illawarra Highway passes through the parish from east to west, and is also a small part of the boundary in the south-west.

References
 
 New South Wales Parish maps preservation project
 Parish of Bong Bong, County of Camden

Parishes of Camden County
Localities in New South Wales
Geography of New South Wales